Leixlip railway station may refer to one of two stations in Leixlip, County Kildare, Ireland:

 Leixlip Louisa Bridge railway station, opened in 1848
 Leixlip Confey railway station, opened in 1990